Maxim "Max" Vladimirovich Letunov (born 20 February 1996) is a Russian professional ice hockey centre who plays for Torpedo Nizhny Novgorod of the Kontinental Hockey League (KHL).

Playing career
Letunov was selected 52nd overall in the 2014 NHL Entry Draft by the St. Louis Blues. After playing for the University of Connecticut, Letunov was signed to an entry-level contract by the San Jose Sharks on 14 March 2018.

He made his NHL debut on 4 February 2020, in a 3–1 win over the Calgary Flames. His first goal came two days later, during a 6–3 win against the Edmonton Oilers.

As a group 6 free agent, Letunov left the Sharks and was signed to a one-year, two-way contract with the Carolina Hurricanes on 31 July 2021. After participating in the Hurricanes training camp, Letunov was assigned to AHL affiliate, the Chicago Wolves, to begin the 2021–22 season. He made 60 appearances with the Wolves, posting 13 goals and 23 points, before he was traded by the Hurricanes to the New York Rangers in exchange for Tarmo Reunanen on 28 March 2022.  

Letunov as a free agent from the Rangers, opted to return to Russia and signed a contract with Torpedo Nizhny Novgorod for the 2022–23 season.

Career statistics

Awards and honors

References

External links

1996 births
Living people
Chicago Wolves players
Hartford Wolf Pack players
Russian expatriate ice hockey people
Russian expatriate sportspeople in the United States
Russian ice hockey centres
San Jose Barracuda players
San Jose Sharks players
St. Louis Blues draft picks
Ice hockey people from Moscow
Torpedo Nizhny Novgorod players
UConn Huskies men's ice hockey players
Youngstown Phantoms players